Transmission rights may refer to:
 Broadcasting rights in mass media
 Transmission rights (electricity market)